Bronwyn Cox (born 19 April 1997) is an Australian representative, national champion and Olympic rower. She was a silver medallist at the 2019 World Championships and won gold and silver medals at Rowing World Cups in the 2019 international representative season.  She rowed in the Australian women's eight at the Tokyo 2020 Olympics.

Club and state rowing
Cox is a West Australian whose senior club rowing has been from the University of Western Australia Boat Club.

Her state representative debut for Western Australia came in the 2015 youth eight which contested the Bicentennial Cup at the Interstate Regatta within the Australian Rowing Championships. She made two further appearances in the West Australian youth eight in 2016  and 2017. Cox stroked the 2017 WA youth eight to a bronze medal in the Bicentennial Cup.

She made Western Australia's senior women's eight in 2018 and contested the Queen's Cup at the Interstate Regatta for WA in 2018 and 2019. In 2019 she stroked the West Australian women's eight to their third placing in the Queen's Cup  and in 2021 again raced in the event.

In a composite pairing with Georgina Gotch from the SUBC, Cox won the 2019 Australian national title in the coxless pair at the 2019 Australian Championships. In 2021 in a National Training Centre eight she won the open women's eight title at the Australian Championships.

International representative rowing
Cox made her Australian representative debut in the coxless pair with Annabelle McIntyre at the 2017 World Rowing U23 Championships in Plovdiv. They rowed to a silver medal. In 2018 she was again selected in Australia's U23 coxless pair and rowed with her fellow West Australian Giorgia Patten to sixth place at the World Rowing Cup III in Lucerne. Cox and Patten then took the pair to the 2018 World Rowing U23 Championships in Poznan and finished in 5th place.

Cox was picked in the Australian women's sweep squad for the 2019 international season. She secured the three seat in the Australian women's eight for both World Rowing Cups in Europe winning a gold medal at the WRC II in Poznan and silver at WRC III in Rotterdam. Cox was selected to race in Australia's women's eight at the 2019 World Rowing Championships in Linz, Austria.  The eight were looking for a top five finish at the 2019 World Championships to qualify for the Tokyo Olympics. They placed second in their heat, came through the repechage and led in the final from the start and at all three 500m marks till they were overrun by New Zealand by 2.7secs. The Australian eight took the silver medal and qualified for Tokyo 2020. 

At the Tokyo 2020 Olympics the Australian women's eight were placed third in their heat, fourth in the repechage and fifth in the Olympic A final. Had they managed to maintain their time of 5:57:15 that they achieved in their repechage they would have beaten the winners, Canada, by nearly two seconds and won the gold medal.

In March 2022 Cox was selected in the women's sweep squad of the broader Australian training team to prepare for the 2022 international season and the 2022 World Rowing Championships.  She rowed in Australian women's coxless four at the World Rowing Cup II in Poznan and in the two seat of the eight at the WRC III in Lucerne to gold medals on both occasions.   At the 2022 World Rowing Championships at Racize, she rowed in the Australian coxless four to a bronze medal.

References

External links

Australian female rowers
1987 births
Living people
World Rowing Championships medalists for Australia
Rowers at the 2020 Summer Olympics
Olympic rowers of Australia
21st-century Australian women